Albert De Paoli (born 1932) is an Australian former association football player.

Playing career

Club career
De Paoli scored on debut for Leichhardt-Annandale as an 18-year-old in July 1950. He later represented APIA Leichhardt.

International career
De Paoli played one match for Australia in 1955.

References

External links
 

Australian soccer players
Australia international soccer players
Living people
Association football forwards
1932 births